Chrysoclista trilychna is a moth of the family Agonoxenidae. It was described by Edward Meyrick in 1928. It is found in India (Madras).

References

Moths described in 1928
Agonoxeninae
Moths of Asia